Shamim M. Momin is an American art director and curator of contemporary art.

Creative work 

Momin is head of the Los Angeles Nomadic Division, a non-profit art organization in Los Angeles, California. She is also an Adjunct Curator for the Whitney Museum of American Art where she co-curated the 2008 and 2004 Whitney Biennial exhibitions.

She has organized solo exhibitions of Terence Koh (2007), Mark Grotjahn (2006), Raymond Pettibon (2005–06), and Banks Violette (2005). As Branch Director and Curator of the former Whitney Museum at Altria, Momin was responsible for organizing exhibitions and commissioning new work by emerging artists for both solo and thematic presentations. Notable Altria projects have featured artists such as Andrea Zittel, Rob Fischer, Sue de Beer, Luis Gispert, Katie Grinnan, Mark Bradford, Dario Robleto, Ellen Harvey, Do-Ho Suh, and E.V. Day.

Publications 
Momin has also contributed to various art-related publications including Phaidon's 2007 exhibition-in-a-book Ice Cream, as well as artist monographs for Alex Katz, Terence Koh, Barnaby Furnas, and Ellen Harvey. Momin also co-authored Whitney Museum of American Art at Altria: 25 Years with Whitney director Adam D. Weinberg.  In 2007, Momin was Adjunct Professor of Contemporary Art in the Williams College Semester in New York program. Her other  curatorial projects include Six Impossible Things Before Breakfast: The Impossibility of Translation (2007), a curated book project with artist Olga Adelantado; No Ordinary Sanctity (2005), a group exhibition at the Deutsche Bank project space, Salzburg, as well as Will Boys be Boys?: Examining Adolescent Masculinity in Contemporary Art (2004–2007), which was organized in conjunction with Independent Curators International and traveled to six venues nationally.

References

Year of birth missing (living people)
Living people
Williams College alumni
American art curators
American women curators
People associated with the Whitney Museum of American Art
21st-century American women